Duke of Fife is a title in the Peerage of the United Kingdom that has been created twice, in both cases for Alexander Duff, 1st Duke of Fife and 6th Earl Fife, who in 1889 married Princess Louise, the eldest daughter of Albert Edward, Prince of Wales (later King Edward VII). The dukedom of Fife was created for a member of the British royal family by marriage, since the first holder's wife was a granddaughter of Queen Victoria.

History 
Alexander Duff (1849–1912) was the eldest son of the 5th Earl Fife (1814–1879). Upon his father's death on 7 August 1879, he succeeded as the 6th Earl Fife. With this, he inherited the titles Baron Braco (created in 1735), Earl Fife and Viscount Macduff (both created in 1759), all in the Peerage of Ireland (and created for Scottish nobleman William Duff, 1696–1763), and Baron Skene in the Peerage of the United Kingdom (created in 1857 for his father The 5th Earl Fife; a title which gave him a seat in the House of Lords). In 1885, Queen Victoria created for Alexander Duff the title Earl of Fife in the Peerage of the United Kingdom.

On Saturday, 27 July 1889, Alexander, 1st Earl of Fife and 6th Earl Fife, married Princess Louise, the third child and eldest daughter of the then-Prince of Wales (the future King Edward VII) and his wife Princess Alexandra, in the Private Chapel at Buckingham Palace. The couple were third cousins in descent from King George III. The wedding marked the second time a descendant of Queen Victoria married a British subject. Two days after the wedding, the Queen elevated Alexander, Lord Fife, to the dignities of Marquess of Macduff, in the County of Banff, and Duke of Fife, both in the Peerage of the United Kingdom. Queen Victoria's Letters Patent of 29 June 1889 creating these titles contained the standard remainder to "heirs male of his body". 

On 24 April 1900, Queen Victoria issued another letters patent by which she created for the 1st Duke of Fife the further dignities of Duke of Fife and Earl of Macduff, both in the Peerage of the United Kingdom, and both with a special remainder that allowed these titles to pass to his daughters by Princess Louise, in default of a son, and then to the male heirs of those daughters. On 9 November 1905, King Edward VII granted to Alexander Duff's two daughters Lady Alexandra (* 1891) and Lady Maud (* 1893) the styles of Highness and Princess.

Upon the death of the 1st Duke of Fife in January 1912, the peerages created in 1889 (the dukedom of Fife of 1889 and the marquessate of Macduff) and all the older (as previously mentioned) peerages held by the Duff family (the barony of Braco of 1735, viscountcy of Macduff of 1759, earldom Fife of 1759, barony of Skene of 1857, earldom of Fife of 1885) became extinct, while the peerages created in 1900 (the dukedom of Fife of 1900 and the earldom of Macduff) passed to his elder daughter, Princess Alexandra (1891–1959).

On 15 October 1913, the 2nd Duchess of Fife married Prince Arthur of Connaught, the only son of Prince Arthur, Duke of Connaught and Strathearn, third son of Queen Victoria and Prince Albert and thus a younger brother of her maternal grandfather King Edward VII. As such, Arthur and Alexandra were first cousins once removed. Their only son, Alastair, died in 1943. 

When the 2nd Duchess of Fife died in 1959, her hereditary peerages passed to her nephew James Carnegie (1929–2015), eldest son of her sister Maud and her husband Charles Carnegie, 11th Earl of Southesk (1893–1992). Thirty-three years later, in 1992, The 3rd Duke of Fife also succeeded his father as 12th Earl of Southesk and chief of the Clan Carnegie. As consequence, the following peerage titles became therefore subsidiary to that of the dukedom: Lord Carnegie of Kinnaird in the Peerage of Scotland (created in 1616), Earl of Southesk and Lord Carnegie in the Peerage of Scotland (both created in 1633), Baron Balinhard in the Peerage of the United Kingdom (created in 1663; all previous mentioned titles awarded to Sir David Carnegie (1575–1658), an Extraordinary Lord of Session), and the Carnegie Baronetcy in the Baronetage of Nova Scotia (created in 1641 for David Carnegie of Pitcarrow (died 1708), a Scottish politician). Upon his death in 2015, he was succeeded in the Fife and Carnegie titles by his son, David Charles Carnegie (born 1961). The 4th Duke of Fife's heir apparent is his son Charles Duff Carnegie (born 1989), who uses the courtesy title Earl of Southesk. The hypothetical grandson of the duke and heir-to-heir apparent would be styled instead Lord Carnegie.

Seats
The family's current main residence is Kinnaird Castle near the town of Brechin in Angus, Scotland. Another seat of the Duke is Elsick House near the town of Stonehaven in Aberdeenshire, Scotland, within the watershed of the Burn of Elsick. The Mar Lodge, to the west of the village of Braemar in Aberdeenshire, Scotland, was bequeathed by Princess Alexandra, 2nd Duchess of Fife, to her nephew Alexander Ramsay of Mar, and subsequently sold. The first two holders of the dukedom are buried in St Ninian's Chapel, Braemar.

Coat of arms

Arms of the 4th Duke
The following heraldic achievement was matriculated by the Court of the Lord Lyon in 2017 for the 4th Duke of Fife: 
Shield: Or, a Lion rampant Gules, armed and langued Azure (the Dukedom of Fife), and on an Inescutcheon Argent, ensigned of an Earl's Coronet proper, an Eagle displayed Azure, armed, beaked and membered Gules, and charged on its breast with an Antique Covered Cup Or (Carnegie). 
 Crest: A Thunderbolt proper, winged Or.
 Supporters: Dexter: a Lion guardant Gules, langued Azure, collared with a Label of five-points Argent, charged with two Thistles proper, between three Crosses of St George Gules. Sinister: a Talbot Argent, collared and langued Gules.
Mottoes: Above the crest, on a Scroll DRED GOD; beneath the shield DEO JUVANTE.

Arms of the 3rd Duke
The arms as borne by the 3rd Duke of Fife were:
Shield: Quarterly:  1st, Or a Lion rampant Gules armed and langued Azure (Dukedom of Fife);  2nd, the arms of the United Kingdom as borne by King Edward VII differenced by a Label of five points Argent the points charged with two Thistles between three Crosses of St George Gules (The Princess Royal, Duchess of Fife);  3rd, grandquarterly:  1st and 4th, Vert a Fess dancetty Ermine between a Hart's Head cabossed in chief and two Escallops in base Or (Duff of Braco);  2nd and 3rd, Gules three Skeans paleways Argent hafted and pommelled Or surmounted by as many Wolves' Heads couped of the third (Skene of that Ilk);  4th, Gules a Banner displayed Argent charged with a Canton Azure a Saltire of the second (Bannerman of Elsick);  over all ensigned of an Earl's Coronet proper an Inescutcheon Argent an Eagle displayed Azure armed beaked and membered Gules on its breast an Antique Covered Cup Or (Carnegie).
 Crests: Centre:  a Thunderbolt proper winged Or (Carnegie);  Dexter:  a Knight denoting the ancient MacDuff armed at all points on a Horse in full speed in his dexter hand a Sword erect all proper his Jupon Argent on his sinister arm a Shield Or charged with a Lion rampant Gules the visor of his helmet shut over which on a Wreath of his liveries with a long Mantling flowing therefrom behind him and ending in a Tassel of the fourth doubling of the third is set a Lion rampant issuing out of a Wreath of the third and fourth the Caparisons of the horse Gules fimbriated Or and thereon six Shields of the last each charged with a Lion rampant of the fourth (Dukedom of Fife);  Sinister:  a Man in armour issuing from the loins and wearing a Tabard emblazoned of the arms Argent on a Fess between three Boars' Heads erased Gules three Mascles Or sustaining with his dexter hand a Banner developed Argent having a Canton Azure charged with a Saltire of the first (Ethel, Countess of Southesk).
Supporters: Dexter:  a Lion rampant guardant Gules langued Azure collared with a Label of five points Argent the points charged with two Thistles between three Crosses of St George Gules;  Sinister:  a Talbot Argent collared Gules the Collar charged with a Label of three points Argent.

Tartan

The Duke of Fife tartan, first designed to celebrate the marriage of Louise, daughter of Edward VII, to Alexander Duff, 1st Duke of Fife.

Duke of Fife (1889-1912)

Dukes of Fife (1900-present)

Line of succession

 Alexander Duff, 1st Duke of Fife (1849-1912)
 Princess Alexandra, 2nd Duchess of Fife (1891-1959)
Maud Carnegie, Countess of Southesk (1893-1945)
 James Carnegie, 3rd Duke of Fife (1929-2015)
 David Carnegie, 4th Duke of Fife (b. 1961)
(1) Charles Carnegie, Earl of Southesk (b. 1989)
(2) Lord George Carnegie (b. 1991)
(3) Lord Hugh Carnegie (b. 1993)

Family tree

See also
Duchess of Fife

References

External links
Duke of Fife

Noble titles created in 1900
Dukedoms in the Peerage of the United Kingdom
Lists of Scottish people
Fife
1889 establishments in the United Kingdom
Noble titles created in 1889
Noble titles created for UK MPs
Peerages created with special remainders